HMS Neptune was a 120-gun first rate ship of the line of the Royal Navy, launched on 22 September 1832 at Portsmouth.

She was fitted with screw propulsion in 1859, and was sold out of the service in 1875.

Notes

References

Lavery, Brian (2003) The Ship of the Line - Volume 1: The development of the battlefleet 1650-1850. Conway Maritime Press. .
Lyon, David and Winfield, Rif (2004) The Sail and Steam Navy List: All the Ships of the Royal Navy 1815-1889. Chatham Publishing, London. .

External links
 

 

1832 ships
Caledonia-class ships of the line
Ships built in Portsmouth
Ships of the line of the Royal Navy
Crimean War naval ships of the United Kingdom